Zarrin Rural District may refer to:
 Zarrin Rural District (Saman County), Chaharmahal and Bakhtiari province
 Zarrin Rural District (Joveyn County), Razavi Khorasan province
 Zarrin Rural District (Ardakan County), Yazd province

See also
 Zarrin Gol Rural District